The Comic Book Greats is a 1991 documentary series produced by Stabur Home Video. The series was hosted by Stan Lee. Stan interviewed a different comic book artist for each episode. The artists interviewed include Todd McFarlane, Rob Liefeld, Jim Lee, Whilce Portacio, Sergio Aragonés, Chris Claremont, Bob Kane, John Romita Sr., John Romita Jr. and Will Eisner.

List of episodes

See also

Characters created by Stan Lee
List of American comics creators
List of Marvel Comics people

References

1991 American television series debuts
1992 American television series endings
1990s American documentary television series
Interviews
Comics artists
Documentary films about comics